Sommot Amon Mak Bridge is a historic bridge over the khlong (canal) in Bangkok. It's located on Bamrung Mueang road between Phra Nakhon district's  Samran Rat sub-district and  Pom Prap Sattru Phai district's Ban Bat sub-district.

The bridge that can be considered as another Saphan Lek (สะพานเหล็ก; lit: iron bridge) of Bangkok alike Damrong Sathit and Phitthaya Sathian bridges. Since it was originally a steel structure and could be removed for boat pass through. So it was named "Saphan Lek Pratu Phi", because the area it's located is called "Pratu Phi" (ประตูผี; ghost gate). This area in the early Rattanakosin period there's gate for transport dead bodies from the inner city or within Grand Palace. Because this area is located in the west, it's believed that the direction of the dead.

Later, in the reign of King Chulalongkorn (Rama V). The bridge has deteriorated, he ordered the Department of Public Works to restore the bridge as a concrete bridge in today, includes was officially named "Sommot Amon Mak" (literally translates as "way of who assume as immortal", that refers to "way of deity", meaning "way of divine king") in honour of Prince Sawasdiprawat.

The striking feature is that the banisters are Ionic architecture. It has been registered as one of the ancient monuments of Bangkok.
At the end of the bridge in Pom Prap Sattru Phai side is an intersection called "Men Pun Intersection", that refers to "cement crematorium intersection". It's an area close to Wat Saket. During the reigns of King Phutthaloetla Naphalai (Rama II) and King Nangklao (Rama III), there was severe epidemics of cholera in Bangkok. There're a lot of dead people and can't be cremated immediately. Many bodies have been left along the road or the temple grounds, so that the vultures are eaten, it's an abomination to those who have seen. The temple that was cremated during that time was Wat Sa Ket, including crematorium made of cement nearby. Presently, the cement crematorium has been demolished but its name still stands today and becomes the official intersection.

References 

Phra Nakhon district
Pom Prap Sattru Phai district
Bridges in Bangkok
History of Bangkok
Registered ancient monuments in Bangkok